This is a list of the top 50 albums in New Zealand of 1998 as compiled by Recorded Music NZ in the end-of-year chart of the Official New Zealand Music Chart. Five albums by New Zealand artists are included on the chart, the highest being The Feelers' debut album Supersystem at No. 2.

Chart 
Key
 – Album of New Zealand origin

References 

1998 in music
1998 record charts
Albums 1998